is an entertainment district in Chūō-ku, one of the wards of Osaka, Japan. The district borders on two other entertainment districts, Shinsaibashi to the north and Dōtonbori to the south. Sōemonchō  has a high concentration of bars, restaurants and nightclubs.

Sōemonchō is featured in the song "Sōemonchō Blues" (宗右衛門町ブルース) by Katsuji Heiwa and Dark Horse, which was released in 1972 and became a major hit in Japan, selling two million copies.

See also
Shinsaibashi
Dōtonbori

References

Entertainment districts in Japan

Restaurant districts and streets in Japan

Tourist attractions in Osaka
Shopping districts and streets in Japan
Geography of Osaka